Elizabeth Chai Vasarhelyi (born ) is an American documentary filmmaker. She was the director, along with her husband, Jimmy Chin, for the film Free Solo, which won the 2019 Academy Award for Best Documentary Feature. The film profiled Alex Honnold and his free solo climb of El Capitan in June 2017.

Early life and education
Vasarhelyi grew up in New York City, and is the daughter of Marina Vasarhelyi, a college administrator, and Miklós Vásárhelyi, a college professor. Her father is from Hungary and her mother is from Hong Kong. Vasarhelyi is a graduate of The Brearley School. She holds a B.A. in Comparative Literature from Princeton University.

Career
Vasarhelyi worked in 2004 as an assistant to director Mike Nichols on the film Closer and has worked extensively with Emmy-Award-winning cinematographer Scott Duncan documenting events such as the Dakar Rally.

Her first film, A Normal Life, won Best Documentary at the Tribeca Film Festival in 2003. Her second film, Youssou N’Dour: I Bring What I Love, was released in theaters in the United States and internationally. The film premiered at the Telluride and Toronto Film Festivals and won numerous awards including the Special Jury Prize at the Middle East International Film Festival in 2008 and a nomination for the Pare Lorentz Award at the 2009 International Documentary Association Awards.

In 2013, Vasarhelyi completed Touba, a documentary on the annual Mouride pilgrimage, the Grand Magaal in Touba, Senegal. It premiered at SXSW 2013, where it won the Special Jury Prize for Best Cinematography.

She returned to Senegal to document the presidential elections of 2012. Incorruptible (formerly An African Spring), the story of Senegalese democracy, won the Independent Spirit Truer Than Fiction Award in 2015. In 2015, Brandon Wilson from IndieWire wrote that Vasarhelyi's "familiarity with the country pays dividends and elevates the piece from being just another tale of civic dysfunction on the African continent."

One of Vasarhelyi's films as a director include the highest grossing independent documentary film of 2015, Meru (Oscars Shortlist 2016; Sundance Audience Award 2015). Variety magazine said: "Jimmy Chin and E. Chai Vasarhelyi's Sundance audience award winner is one of the best sports documentaries of its type in recent years."

Vasarhelyi and Chin's 2018 film Free Solo won the People's Choice Award: Documentaries at the 2018 Toronto International Film Festival. The film has received critical acclaim as a riveting documentary and a profound story of human endeavor. Jeannette Catsoulis from The New York Times called Free Solo, "an engaging study of a perfect match between passion and personality."

Vasarhelyi and Chin discuss filming the climb in their New York Times opinion piece, saying, "Throughout history, documentarians have had to struggle with the blurred lines of their responsibility to their subjects. We were haunted by the possibility that our presence might put him at more risk every time we turned on the cameras." 
Vasarhelyi has directed a New York Times Op Doc, an episode for Netflix's non-fiction design series ABSTRACT, and two episodes for ESPN’s non-fiction series Future of Sports.

Free Solo won the 2019 Academy Award for Best Documentary Feature.

Vasarhelyi has received grants from the Sundance Institute, the Ford Foundation, the Rockefeller Brothers Fund, Bertha Britdoc, the William and Mary Greve Foundation and the National Endowment of the Arts.

She was selected as a 2013 Sundance Documentary Film Fellow, named one of Filmmaker magazine's 25 New Faces of Independent Film in 2005[4] and received an Achievement Award from Creative Visions foundation in 2008.

Personal life
Vasarhelyi married Jimmy Chin, a photographer for National Geographic and a professional skier and climber, on May 26, 2013. They have two children. Vasarhelyi met Chin at a conference at Lake Tahoe in 2012.

Awards
2003: Tribeca Film Festival Best Documentary Feature for A Normal Life
2008: Middle East International Film Festival Special Jury Prize for Youssou N'Dour: I Bring What I Love
2008: International Documentary Association Pare Lorentz Award (nominee) for Youssou N'Dour: I Bring What I Love
2008: Bahamas International Film Festival Audience Award for Youssou N'Dour: I Bring What I Love
2008: Bahamas International Film Festival Spirit of Freedom Award for Youssou N'Dour: I Bring What I Love
2008: DC International Film Festival Audience Award for Youssou N'Dour: I Bring What I Love
2008: São Paulo International Film Festival Audience Award for Youssou N'Dour: I Bring What I Love
2008: Nashville Film Festival Music of Impact Award for Youssou N'Dour: I Bring What I Love
Toronto International Film Festival Special Presentation for Youssou N'Dour: I Bring What I Love
2013: SXSW Special Jury Prize for Best Cinematography for Touba
2015: Independent Spirit Truer Than Fiction Award Winner for Incorruptible
2015: Woodstock Film Festival Maverick Award for Best Feature Documentary for Incorruptible
2015: One World Film Festival Václav Havel Jury Award for Incorruptible
2015: Oscar Shortlist for Best Documentary Feature for Meru
2015: Sundance Audience Award Winner for Meru
2015: Independent Spirit Award Nomination for Best Documentary for Meru
2015: DGA Award Nomination for Outstanding Directorial Achievement in Documentary for Meru
2015: PGA Award Nomination for Outstanding Producer of Documentary Theatrical Motion Pictures for Meru
2015: Cinema Eye Honors Audience Choice Prize Winner for Meru
2015: Cinema Eye Honors Award Winner for Outstanding Achievement in Cinematography for Meru
2015: Cinema Eye Honors Award Nomination for Outstanding Achievement in Production for Meru
2015: Cinema Eye Honors Award Nomination for Outstanding Achievement in Original Music Score for Meru
2015: The New York Times, Critics' Pick for Meru
2016: Oscar's Shortlist for Meru
2018: People's Choice Documentary award at Toronto International Film Fest for Free Solo 
2018: Mill Valley Film Festival Valley of the Docs People's Choice awards
2018: Virginia Film Festival Documentary Feature Audience Award
2018: Critics Choice Award for Best Documentary for Free Solo 
2018: Critics Choice Award for Best Sports Documentary for Free Solo 
2019: BAFTA Award for Best Documentary for Free Solo
2019: Academy Award for Best Documentary Feature for Free Solo

Filmography
2003: A Normal Life
2008: Youssou N'Dour: I Bring What I Love
2013: Touba
2015: Incorruptible
2015: Meru
2017: Abstract: The Art of Design (TV series documentary)
2018: Free Solo
2018: Enhanced (TV series documentary)
2021: The Rescue
2022: Return to Space
2022: Edge of the Unknown with Jimmy Chin
2023: Wild Life
TBA: Nyad

References

A Mountaineer in Manhattan
Wall Street Journal, June 5, 2009
THE TREATMENT/Elvis Mitchell: Chai Vasarhelyi interview, July 8, 2009
Elle.com interview with Chai Vasarhelyi, July 1, 2009
New York Magazine May 10, 2009

External links

Meru website
Chai Vasarhelyi", Freethebid.com
"What if He Falls?", New York Times Op-Doc Opinion piece by Vasarhelyi and Jimmy Chin

Living people
American documentary filmmakers
American film directors of Hong Kong descent
American people of Hungarian descent
Brearley School alumni
Directors of Best Documentary Feature Academy Award winners
Film directors from New York City
Princeton University alumni
Primetime Emmy Award winners
American women documentary filmmakers
Year of birth missing (living people)
21st-century American women